The Kagonesti is a fantasy novel by Douglas Niles, set in the world of Dragonlance, and based on the Dungeons & Dragons role-playing game. It is the first novel in the "Lost Histories" series. It was published in paperback in January 1995.

Plot summary
The Kagonesti (A Story of the Wild Elves) details the historical roots and struggles of the Kagonesti, the wild elves of Krynn.

Reception

Reviews
Kliatt

References

1995 novels
Dragonlance novels